Still Green is singer-songwriter Patty Larkin's thirteenth album. Released by Signature Sounds in 2013.

Track listing

 "Best of Intentions"
 "Down Through the Wood"
 "It Could Be Worse"
 "Soon As I'm Better"
 "Bon Vivants"
 "Green Behind the Ears"
 "My Baby"
 "Mando Drum"
 "New Hotel"
 "So Cold"
 "Nothing Else Really Matters"
 "Because of This"

References

External links
https://www.discogs.com/release/12566752-Patty-Larkin-Still-Green

Patty Larkin albums
2020 albums